Shikharji, also known as Sammed or Sammet Shikharji, is one of the Holiest pilgrimage sites for Jains, in Giridih district, Jharkhand. It is located on Parasnath hill, the highest mountain in the state of Jharkhand. It is the most important Jain Tirtha (pilgrimage site) by both Digambara and Śvētāmbara, for it is the place where twenty of the twenty-four Jain tirthankaras (supreme preachers of Dharma) along with many other monks attained Moksha. It is one of the five principal pilgrimage destinations along with Girnar,Pawapuri, champapuri, Dilwara, Palitana and Ashtapad Kailash.

Etymology 
Shikharji means the "venerable peak". The site is also called Sammed Śikhar "peak of concentration" because it is a place where twenty of twenty-four Tirthankaras attained Moksha through meditation. The word "Parasnath" is derived from Lord Parshvanatha, the twenty-third Jain Tirthankara, who was one of those who attained Moksha at the site in 772 BCE.

Geography 
Shikarji is located in an inland part of rural east India. It lies on NH-2, the Delhi-Kolkata highway in a section called the Grand Trunk road Shikharji rises to  making it the highest mountain in Jharkhand state.

Jain tradition 

Shikharji is the place where twenty of the twenty-four Jain tirthankaras including Parshvanatha along with many other monks attained Moksha. This pilgrimage site is considered the most important Jain Tirtha by both Digambara and Śvētāmbara. Shikharji along with Ashtapad, Girnar, Dilwara Temples of Mount Abu and Shatrunjaya are known as Śvētāmbara Pancha Tirth (five principal pilgrimage shrine).

History 

Archaeological evidences indicate the presence of Jains going back to at least 1500 BCE. The earliest literary reference to Shikharji as a tirth (place of pilgrimage) is found in the Jñātṛdhārmakātha, one of the twelve core texts of Jainism compiled in 6th century BCE by chief disciple of Mahavira. Shikharji is also mentioned in the Pārśvanāthacarita, a twelfth-century biography of Pārśva. A 13th century CE palm-leaf manuscript of Kalpa Sūtra and Kalakacaryakatha has an image of a scene of Parshavanatha's nirvana at Shikharji.

Modern history records show that Shikharji Hill is regarded as the place of worship of the Jain community. Vastupala, prime minister during the reign of king Vīradhavala and Vīsaladeva of Vaghela dynasty, constructed a Jain temple housing 20 idols of Tirthankaras. The temple also housed images of his ancestors and Samavasarana. During the regime of Mughal's rule in India, Emperor Akbar in the year 1583 had passed an firman (official order) granting the management of Shikharji Hill to the Jain community to prevent the slaughter of animals in the vicinity. Seth Hiranand Mukim, personal jeweller of Mughal Emperor Jahangir, lead a party from Agra to Shikharji for Jain pilgrimage. In 2019, the Government of Delhi included Sammed Shikharji under Mukhyamantri Tirth Yatra Yojana.

Approach 

The pilgrimage of Shikharji starts with a Palganj on Giridih road. Palganj has a small shrine dedicated to Parshvanatha. Then, offerings are made to temples at Madhuban on the base of Parasnath hill. Madhuban has many dharamshalas and bhojnalayas for pilgrims.

The section from Gandharva Nala stream to the summit is the most sacred to Jains. The pilgrimage is made on foot or by a litter or doli carried by a doliwallah along a concrete paved track.

Temples 

Shikharji is considered as the most important pilgrimage centre by both the Digambara and Śvētāmbara sects of Jainism and the jurisdiction of the main temples is shared by both sects.

The current structure of temples at Shikharji was re-built by Jagat Seth in 1768 CE. However, the idol itself is very old. The Sanskrit inscription at the foot of the image is dated 1678 CE. One of the shrines dates back to the 14th century. Several Śvētāmbara temples were constructed in 20th century. Pilgrims offer rice, sandal, dhupa, flower, fruits and diya.

At the base of Shikharji is a temple to Bhomiyaji (Taleti). On the walls of the Jain temple at the village of Madhuban, there is a mural painting depicting all the temples on Parasnath Hill. Śvētāmbara Bhaktamara temple, established by Acharya Ramchandrasuri, is the first temple to house a Bhaktamara Stotra yantra.

A large Digambar Jain temple depicting Nandishwar Dweep is at the base of the hill. The Nichli temple, built by a Calcutta merchant in 18th century, is noteworthy for its architecture. The temple features arched gateways and carvings of Tirthankaras on the temple wall.

Tonks 

There are 31 tonks each enshrines footprints, in black or white marble, of each Tirthankara. Since, these temple does not have images these tonks are worshipped by both Digambara and Śvētāmbara.

 Parshvanatha tonk
The hilltop where Parshvanatha attained moksha is called 'suvarṇabhadra kūța' and is considered the most sacred hilltop on Shikharji. The Parshvanatha tonk is constructed at this summit. The chatra distinguishes Parshvanatha footprint from footprints of other 23 Tirthankaras which does not have chatra and are indistinguishable.  The temple consists of two floors.  The top floor has a tonk with no footprints of Parshvanatha, and lower floor enshrines a saffron coloured replica of the face of Parasnath built into a wall. Devotees make offerings of uncooked rice and sweets here.

The tonks along the track are as follows:

 Gautam Ganadhara Swami 
 Kunthunatha
 Rishabha
 Chandraprabha
 Naminatha
 Aranatha
 Māllīnātha
 Shreyanasanatha
 Pushpadanta
 Padmaprabha
 Munisuvratnath
 Chandraprabha
 Rishabha
 Anantanatha
 Shitalanatha
 Sambhavanatha
 Vasupujya
 Abhinandananatha
 Ganadhara
 Jal Mandir
 Dharmanatha
 Mahavira
 Varishen
 Sumatinatha
 Shantinatha
 Mahavira
 Suparshvanatha
 Vimalanatha
 Ajitanatha
 Neminatha
 Parshvanatha

Fair 
Sammed Shikhar festival is annual fair organised here that draws a huge number of devotees.

Replicas 

The representation of Sammeta-Shikharji is a popular theme in Jain shrines.

On August 13, 2012, the world's first to-scale complete replication of Shikharji was opened in Siddhachalam in New Jersey over 120 acres of hilly terrain called Shikharji at Siddhachalam, it has become an important place of pilgrimage for the Jain diaspora. There is a small scale replica of Shikharji at Dādābadī, Mehrauli. Ranakpur Jain temple has a depiction of Shikharji. Shitalnath temple in Patan, Gujarat has a wooden plaque with carving of Shikharji.

Transport 
The nearest railway station is Parasnath Station which is situated in Isri Bazar, Dumri, Jharkhand. It is around 25 km from Madhuban, at the base of Shikharji. Parasnath station is situated on Grand Chord, which is part of Howrah-Gaya-Delhi line and Howrah-Allahabad-Mumbai line. Many long-distance trains halt at Parasnath Station. Daily connectivities to Mumbai, Delhi, Jaipur, Ajmer, Kolkata, Patna, Allahbad, Kanpur, Jammutawi, Amritsar, Kalka etc. are available. Even 12301-12302 Howrah Rajdhani Express via Gaya Junction has a halt on Parasnath station which run 6 days a week.

By Airway;

The Nearest airport is Deoghar airport in Deoghar Dist, known as Baidyanath dham which is famous for Hindu pilgrimage sites, part of 12 jyotirling for Lord Shiva. The airport is 107 km away from Shikharji and a 3-hour drive.

Another airport is Kazi Nazrul Islam Airport, Durgapur (RDP) West Bengal and a 4-hour drive from the airport. Durgapur has direct flights from Kolkata and Delhi

Birsa Munda Airport, Ranchi (IXR), Jharkhand is also around 180 km (Approximately 4.5 hours), and the drive to Shikhar Ji is quite smooth. Direct flights are available from Delhi.

Shikharji movement 
Save Shikharji was a protest movement by Jain sects against the state's alleged development plans for Shikharji. Jains opposed the plans of the state government to improve the infrastructure on the site of the hill in order to boost tourism as alleged attempts to commercialize the Shikharji hill. The movement demanded that Shikharji Hill be declared officially a place of worship by the Government of Jharkhand. On 26 October 2018, the Government of Jharkhand issued an official memorandum declaring the Shikharji hill as a 'place of worship'.

In December 2022, Jains carried out massive protests and a one-day nationwide strike against the rule by the Government of Jharkhand to tag Shikharji as a place of tourism. 

In January 2023, the Central government halted all tourism development activities on Parasnath Hills. Jharkhand's autochthonous communities, such as the Adivasis Santals (of the Sarna faith), also began a counter-protest to re-assert their ancestral religious rights, which include animal sacrifices in Marang Buru. The Adivasi Sengel Abhiyan (ASA) launched 'Marang Buru Bachao Bharat Yatra' in order to curtail "Jain hegemony" over the region.

Gallery

See also 

 List of Jain temples
 Tirth Pat
 Nirvana Kanda

References

Citation

Sources

Books

Web

External links 

 
 

Jain temples in Jharkhand
Buildings and structures in Jharkhand
Tourist attractions in Jharkhand
Cities and towns in Giridih district
Holy cities
Religion in Jharkhand
Jain pilgrimage sites